Brooksville is the name of several places in the United States:
 Brooksville, Blount County, Alabama
 Brooksville, Morgan County, Alabama
 Brooksville, Florida
Brooksville Army Airfield, named after the Florida town
 Brooksville, Georgia
 Brooksville, Kentucky
Brooksville Independent-Graded School District, named after the Kentucky town
 Brooksville, Maine
 Brooksville, Mississippi
 Brooksville, Oklahoma
 Brooksville, West Virginia, an unincorporated community also known as Bigbend, West Virginia

See also
 Brookville (disambiguation)
 Brooksville Advent Church,  named after the village of Brooksville in New Haven, Vermont